On May 29, 1929, a series of explosions in the sewers of Ottawa, Ontario, Canada, killed one person.

The first blast occurred just after noon in the Golden Triangle area, west of the canal; over the next 25 minutes, a series of explosions travelled the length of the main line of the sewer system. The explosions first moved east under the canal and then moved through Sandy Hill under Somerset Street. After passing under the Rideau River, they followed the line as it turned north through what is today Vanier, before going through New Edinburgh to the point where the sewer system emptied into the Ottawa River.

The blasts were fairly small, except when manhole covers were involved. At these points, the access to oxygen fuelled towering flames that erupted through the manhole covers onto city streets. The covers themselves were blown high into the air.

Most of the damage from the sewer explosions occurred where sewage lines were attached to less sturdy pipes inside houses; blasts destroyed the plumbing in many residential basements.  Besides property damage, the explosions caused one death and many injuries.

The cause of the explosions was never definitively determined. Methane naturally occurs in sewers, but it never accumulates in a concentration powerful enough to cause explosions of the magnitude seen in Ottawa. The Ottawa Gas Company vehemently insisted that the disaster could not have been caused by its lines.

It is now thought that the fuel stations and mechanic shops in the city—new since the introduction of the automobile—contributed to the calamity. While these shops were required by law to dispose of all waste oils in a safe manner, there were no inspections; dumping waste into the sewage system was commonplace. In combination with problems in the sewer system's design, this pollution likely caused the 1929 blasts.

See also
 Louisville sewer explosions, 1981
 1992 Guadalajara explosions
 2014 Kaohsiung gas explosions

References

Bibliography 

Explosions in 1929
May 1929 events
1929 sewer explosion
Explosions in Canada
Sewerage
1929 disasters in Canada
1920s in Ottawa
1929 in Ontario